The Scottish Junior Football North Second Division known as the McBookie.com North Second Division is the third tier of the North Region of the Scottish Junior Football Association. Clubs at the end of the season are promoted to the North First Division. It is part of the lowest level of the Scottish football pyramid.

It is essentially a resurrection of the North Division Two which ran until 2013, when the restructure of the Scottish Junior Football North Division One above into two geographical sections caused the lower tier to contain an impractically low number of members (6 teams), leading to its disbandment for five seasons until the previous three-division setup was adopted once again.

Season summaries

References

2
2018 establishments in Scotland
Sports leagues established in 2018